The 1999 World Rhythmic Gymnastics Championships were held at Osaka Municipal Central Gymnasium in Osaka, Japan from October 12–17, 1999.

Medal winners

Individual

Groups

Individuals final Final

Team All-around

Individual All-around

Individual Rope

Individual Hoop

Individual Ball

Individual Ribbon

Groups

Groups All-around

Groups 10 Clubs

Groups 3 Ribbons + 2 Hoops

References

Rhythmic Gymnastics World Championships
Rhythmic Gymnastics Championships
R
World Rhythmic
R